This is a list of mayors (Stadtammänner) of Zofingen, Aargau, Switzerland.

Zofingen
Zofingen
Lists of mayors (complete 1900-2013)